Gambling is a surname. Notable people with the surname include:

John B. Gambling (1897–1974), host of the radio show "Rambling With Gambling" from 1925 to 1959
John A. Gambling (1930–2004), host of the radio show "Rambling With Gambling" from 1959 to 1991
John R. Gambling (born 1950), host of the radio show "Rambling With Gambling" from 1991 to 2000
Professor Alec Gambling (1926-2021) Electrical engineer and pioneer of optical fibre communication